The word knapsack can refer to:
 a backpack
 Knapsack, Germany, a locality of Hürth, Rhine-Erft district, North Rhine-Westphalia
 the knapsack problem, a math problem
 the subset sum problem, a special case of the above
 Naccache-Stern knapsack cryptosystem, a cryptosystem based on the knapsack problem
 Knapsack (band), an American band
 "Knapsack!", an episode of Aqua Teen Hunger Force